

This is a list of the National Register of Historic Places listings in Edmunds County, South Dakota.

This is intended to be a complete list of the properties on the National Register of Historic Places in Edmunds County, South Dakota, United States. The locations of National Register properties and districts for which the latitude and longitude coordinates are included below, may be seen in a map.

There are 11 properties listed on the National Register in the county. Another 2 properties were once listed but have been removed.

Current listings

|}

Former listings

|}

See also

 List of National Historic Landmarks in South Dakota
 National Register of Historic Places listings in South Dakota

References

 
Edmunds County
Buildings and structures in Edmunds County, South Dakota